The electoral history of Gretchen Whitmer, spans two decades, from 2000 to the present. Whitmer currently serves as the Governor of Michigan, a position she had held since 2018 and was reelected to in 2022.

State House

2000

2002

2004

State Senate

2006 special election

2006

2010

Governor

2018

2022

References 

Gretchen Whitmer
Whitmer, Gretchen